Bhojpuri cinema is an Indian film industry of Bhojpuri-language motion pictures. It is based in western Bihar and eastern Uttar Pradesh with major production centres in Lucknow and Patna.

Bhojpuri cinema is a major part of Bihari cinema. The first Bhojpuri talkie film, Ganga Maiyya Tohe Piyari Chadhaibo, was released in 1963 by Vishwanath Shahabadi. The 1980s saw the release of many notable as well as run-of-the-mill Bhojpuri films like Bitia Bhail Sayan, Chandwa ke take Chakor, Hamar Bhauji, Ganga Kinare Mora Gaon and Sampoorna Tirth Yatra. 

Bhojpuri cinema has grown in recent years. The Bhojpuri film industry is now a 2000 crore industry. Bhojpuri cinema also caters to second and third generation emigrants who still speak the language, in Guyana, Trinidad and Tobago, Suriname, Fiji, Mauritius, and South Africa.

Overview 
Bhojpuri originates in Western Bihar and Eastern Uttar Pradesh in East India. Speakers of it and its creoles are found in many parts of the world, including the United States, the United Kingdom, Fiji, Guyana, Mauritius, South Africa, Suriname, and Trinidad and Tobago, and The Netherlands. During the late 1800s and early 1900s, many colonizers faced labor shortages due to the abolition of slavery; thus, they imported many Indians, many from Bhojpuri-speaking regions, as indentured servants to labor on plantations.  Today, some 200 million people in the Caribbean, Oceania, and North America who speak Bhojpuri as a native or second language.

History
In the 1960s, the first president of India, Rajendra Prasad, who hailed from Bihar, met Bollywood actor Nazir Hussain and asked him to make a movie in Bhojpuri, which eventually led to the release of the first Bhojpuri film in 1963. Bhojpuri cinema's history begins with the well-received film Ganga Maiyya Tohe Piyari Chadhaibo ("Mother Ganges, I will offer you a yellow sari"), which was produced by Biswanath Prasad Shahabadi under the banner of Nirmal Pictures and directed by Kundan Kumar. Throughout the following decades, films were produced in fits and starts. Bidesiya ("Foreigner", 1963, directed by S. N. Tripathi) and Ganga ("Ganges", 1965, directed by Kundan Kumar) were profitable and popular, but in general Bhojpuri films were not commonly produced in the 1960s and 1970s.

In the 1980s, enough Bhojpuri films were produced to tentatively make up an industry. Films such as Mai ("Mom", 1989, directed by Rajkumar Sharma) and Hamar Bhauji ("My Elder Brother's Wife", 1983, directed by Kalpataru) continued to have at least sporadic success at the box office. Nadiya Ke Paar is a 1982 Hindi-Bhojpuri blockbuster directed by Govind Moonis and starring Sachin, Sadhana Singh, Inder Thakur, Mitali, Savita Bajaj, Sheela David, Leela Mishra and Soni Rathod. However, this trend faded out by the end of the decade. By 1990, the nascent industry seemed to be completely finished.

The industry took off again in 2001 with the Silver Jubilee hit Saiyyan Hamar ("My Sweetheart", directed by Mohan Prasad), which shot its hero, Ravi Kissan, to superstardom. This was quickly followed by several other remarkably successful films, including Panditji Batai Na Biyah Kab Hoi ("Priest, tell me when I will marry", 2005, directed by Mohan Prasad) and Sasura Bada Paisa Wala ("My father-in-law, the rich guy", 2005). In a measure of the Bhojpuri film industry's rise, both of these did much better business in the states of Bihar and Jharkhand than mainstream Bollywood hits at the time. Both films, made on extremely tight budgets, earned back more than ten times their production costs. Sasura Bada Paisa Wala introduced Manoj Tiwari, formerly a well-loved folk singer, to the wider audiences of Bhojpuri cinema. In 2008, he and Ravi Kissan were the leading actors of Bhojpuri films, and their fees increase with their fame. The extremely rapid success of their films has led to dramatic increases in Bhojpuri cinema's visibility, and the industry now supports an awards show and a trade magazine, Bhojpuri City, which chronicles the production and release of what are now over 100 films per year.

Many of the major stars of mainstream Bollywood cinema, including Amitabh Bachchan, have recently worked in Bhojpuri films. Mithun Chakraborty's Bhojpuri debut Bhole Shankar, released in 2008, is considered the biggest Bhojpuri hit of all time. Also in 2008, a 21-minute diploma Bhojpuri film by Siddharth Sinha, Udedh Bun (Unravel) was selected for world premiere at the Berlin International Film Festival. Later it won the National Film Award for Best Short fiction Film.

Bhojpuri poet Manoj Bhawuk has written a history of Bhojpuri cinema. Bhawuk is widely known as "Encyclopedia of Bhojpuri Cinema".

In February 2011, a three-day film and cultural festival in Patna marking 50 years of Bhojpuri cinema, opened Ganga Maiyya Tohe Piyari Chadhaibo the first Bhojpuri film. The first Bhojpuri Reality Film "Dhokha" is under production under banner Om Kaushik Films is about to be nominated and screened in different International Film Festivals under direction Of Rashmi Raj Kaushik Vicky and Renu Chaudhary.

Notable people 
Notable personalities of the Bhojpuri film industry include:

Actors

Actresses

Film producers 
 
 
Neetu Chandra
Rajkumar R. Pandey

Film directors

Rajnish Mishra
Santosh Mishra
Rajkumar R. Pandey
Ajay Srivastava
S. N. Tripathi

Music directors
Chitragupt (composer)
Damodar Raao

Lyricists
Shailendra (lyricist)

Screenwriters

Singers

Notable films

Highest-grossing films
Below are the highest-grossing Bhojpuri films of all time:

Notable awards

See also 
 Cinema of Bihar
 Patna Film Festival
 Rajgir Film City

References

External links 
 
 

 
Bhojpuri cinema
Cinema of Bihar